Monk is an English surname. Notable people with this surname include the following:

Monk (Berkshire cricketer), English professional cricketer in the 1790s
Allan Monk (born 1942), Canadian baritone
Art Monk (born 1957), American football player who played in the 1980s and 1990s
Cyril Monk (1882–1970), Australian violinist
Cyrus Monk (born 1996), Australian cyclist
Debra Monk (born 1949), American actress, singer, and writer
Elizabeth Monk (1898–1980), Canadian lawyer and city councillor
Frank Monk (1886–1962), English footballer (Southampton, Glossop, Fulham)
Frederick Debartzch Monk (1856–1914), Canadian lawyer and politician
Garry Monk (born 1979), English footballer
George William Monk (1838–?), a Canadian politician
Geraldine Monk (born 1952), British poet
Hank Monk, legendary stagecoach driver in the American west
Henry Wentworth Monk (1827–1896), millenarian prophet and early Zionist
Ian Monk (born 1960), British writer and translator
James Henry Monk (1784–1856), English divine and classical scholar
Karyn Monk, historical romance novelist
Lorraine Monk (1922-2020), Canadian photographer
Malik Monk (born 1998), American basketball player
Marcus Monk (born 1986), NFL football player; brother of Malik
Maria Monk (1816–1849), supposed author of The Hidden Secrets of a Nun's Life in a Convent Exposed
Meredith Monk (born 1942), American composer, performer, director, vocalist, film-maker, and choreographer
Quincy Monk (1979–2015), was an American football linebacker
Ray Monk (born 1957), professor of philosophy at the University of Southampton
Robert W. Monk (1866–1924), American physician and politician
Robert A. G. Monks (b. 1933), American entrepreneur, politician, and corporate activist
Scott Monk (born 1974), Australian author
Sophie Monk (born 1979), Australian pop singer, actress and occasional model
Thelonious Monk (1917–1982), jazz pianist and composer
T. S. Monk (born 1949), his son, American jazz drummer, composer and bandleader
Wendy Monk (1915–2000); Wendy Trewin, English author
William Henry Monk (1823–1889), English hymn tune writer

English-language surnames